The Citroën H-Type vans (but mostly Citroën HY), are a series of  panel vans and light trucks, produced by French automaker Citroën for 34 years (from 1947 through 1981), that are memorable for their Industrial design, using many corrugated metal outer body panels, to save material, weight, and costs. Early models of the uniquely styled trucks were just named Type H, but soon they were differentiated by a second letter, using the last four letters in the alphabet – except for the type HP for (flat-bed) pickups. Thus the vans were built as the types HW through HZ – with the majority  of them built as Citroën HY.

The Citroën H-types were developed as simple, low-cost, front-wheel drive vans after World War II, using the same design philosophy as on Citroën's 2CV, but featuring a frameless, unitary body-structure. A total of 473,289 of their variants were produced in 34 years in factories in France and Belgium.

Design
Like the 1934 Citroën Traction Avant, the H had a unitary body with no separate frame, front independent suspension, and front-wheel drive. For a commercial van, this combination provided unique benefits: a  flat floor very close to the ground, and  standing height. Loading is by a combination of an upward-hinged tailgate with lower double half-doors at the rear, and optionally a sliding door on the side. There were short and long wheelbase models, and choice of short or longer rear overhang. Sides of the vans got varying treatments.

The distinctive corrugated bodywork used throughout the period of production was inspired by German Junkers (Aircraft) starting from the First World War until the 1930s, the three-engined Junkers Ju 52 being the last to use this construction. Henry Ford also adopted this construction for the Ford Tri-Motor passenger aircraft. The ribs added strength without adding weight, and required only simple, low-cost press tools. The flat body panels were braced on the inside by 'top hat' box sections, at right angles to the ribs.  The welded floor was strong enough to support a horse.

Marketing
Most H Vans were sold in France, Belgium and the Netherlands. At the Slough Trading Estate assembly facility (1926-1966), Citroën UK built a very small number of right hand drive versions. The German market however, was supplied by key competitors: the direct rival Volkswagen Type 2; plus the also front-drive DKW Schnellaster minivan.

As with the Volkswagen, the H Van could not be sold in the US as a commercial vehicle after 1964, due to the Chicken tax.

Mechanical
The engine, gearbox and many smaller parts are shared with other Citroën models. The engine and gearbox are nearly identical to those in the Traction Avant and later the DS, only mounted with the engine in front of the gearbox. The headlights  were identical to those of the 2CV, while speedometers were successively borrowed from the Traction Avant and the Ami 6.

While the derated "Traction Avant" 4-cylinder engine and the unsophisticated 3-speed gearbox (non synchromesh on first gear) offered only a modest top speed of just under 100 km/h, the chassis and suspension layout provided good roadholding qualities for a van of the era, especially on the short wheelbase version: low slung chassis, with very little overhangs, combined with sophisticated totally independent suspensions (the front ones used double torsion bars instead of conventional coil springs). 
The 1.9 litre engine offered more usable power than the 1.2 litre of its competitor, the 1950 Volkswagen Type 2.

Styling changes
The basic design changed very little from 1947 to 1981.

Vehicles left the Citroën factory with only three body styles: the standard enclosed van, a pick-up version, and a stripped-down body which went to non-Citroën coach-builders and formed the basis for the cattle-truck and other variants. The basic version had an overall length of 4.26m, but vehicles were also available in a long wheelbase version with an overall length of 5.24m.

In September 1963 the earlier style rear window - a narrow vertical window with curved corners - was replaced with a square window the same height but wider, 45 cm on each side. The bonnet was modified to give two additional rectangular air intakes at the lower edges, one for a heater, the other a dummy for symmetry.

In early 1964, the split windscreen used since 1947 was replaced with a single windscreen, while in late 1964 the chevrons on the radiator grille, previously narrow aluminum strips similar to those on the Traction Avant, were replaced with the shorter, pointed style of chevrons as used on most Citroën vehicles in the last decades of the twentieth century.

In November 1969 the small parking lights were discontinued, the front indicators were recessed into the wings, and the shape of the rear wings was changed from semi-circular to rectangular.

Rear hinged 'Suicide' cab doors were used until the end of production in 1981, except on vehicles manufactured for the Dutch market where conventionally hinged doors were available from 1968.

Names
Citroën's teams worked on 8 projects and only the last one was developed, giving it its name : "H".
Most Type H vans were sold as model HY. Other models include H (early versions), HX (lesser load capacity), HP (flat-bed pick-up), HZ, and HW (greater load capacity). For a time they were also sold as model 1600. When used by the police, it was called "panier à salade" ("salad basket").

Legacy

Vintage H vans are still a common sight in Europe and in cosmopolitan cities around the world, serving as stylish food trucks evoking a retro continental image to the business. Vintage versions are available as non-operating static displays or upgraded with modern engines and power steering.

Italian coachbuilder Fabrizio Caselani of FC Automobili has resurrected the classic design with in honor of the H van's 70th anniversary in 2017, and produces with a body kit based on the modern Fiat Ducato/Citroën Jumper/Ram ProMaster X290 platform, and a smaller HG version based on the Citroën Jumpy PSA EMP2 platform, both under license from Citroën.

References

External links

Citroen Type H - Citroën Origins
H Van at Citroenet
Carrosserie Caselani Type H

H Van
Cab over vehicles
Vehicles introduced in 1947
Vans
Front-wheel-drive vehicles